The Arlington Million is a Grade 1 flat horse race in the United States for thoroughbred horses aged three years and upward on the turf. It was originally raced at the now-closed Arlington Park in Arlington Heights, Illinois over a distance of  miles. 

The Arlington Million is the first thoroughbred race to offer a purse of US$1,000,000. It is part of the Breeders' Cup Challenge series, and the winner automatically qualifies for the Breeders' Cup Turf.

Churchill Downs, whose parent company owns the land of the defunct Arlington Park racetrack, hosted the Arlington Million in 2022. The 2023 race will be run at Churchill-owned Colonial Downs in Virginia.

History
The Arlington Million was introduced in 1981 by Joe Joyce, the father of TVG's Mike Joyce and the president of Arlington Park at the time. The winner receives 60% of the million dollar purse and the Arlington Million Trophy. The race was graded after only its second running and was awarded a grade one status in 1983 based on the talent of the runners that raced in its first two years.

The horse John Henry won the race twice. On August 30, 1981, Willie Shoemaker became the first jockey to win a $1 million thoroughbred horse race when John Henry took the inaugural Arlington Million by a nose over The Bart. The track famously ran the Arlington Million in 1985 under the shadow of a burnt-out grandstand, after a fire had occurred there 25 days earlier. In 2007, Jambalaya became the first Canadian bred horse to win the Arlington Million, with his trainer, Catherine Day Phillips, being the first female trainer to ever win the race.

The race has been run under several different names in the past: In 1981, it was called the Arlington Million Invitational Stakes; from 1982 through 1984 it was known as the Budweiser Million Stakes; from 1985 through 1987, it was the Budweiser-Arlington Million. In 1988, the race was held at Woodbine Racetrack in Toronto, Ontario to accommodate for the completion of repairs from a 1985 fire, and there was no race held in 1998 or 1999 during a two-year shutdown of Arlington Park. In 2021, the final year of live racing at Arlington, the race was called the Mister D. Stakes (after Richard L. Duchossois) with a purse of $600,000.

The 2022 Arlington Million was run at Churchill Downs. The Louisville racetrack's parent company, Churchill Downs Incorporated (which owns the Arlington Park property), announced that it would relocate the race along with several of Arlington's traditional stakes races. A special one-day Arlington Million racing card was held at Churchill on August 13, 2022. The plans were made possible after Churchill reached an agreement with Ellis Park, which normally controls racing in Kentucky during the summer, along with the Kentucky Horse Racing Commission and Kentucky horsemen. The move was criticized by the president of a group representing Illinois horsemen. Illinois Thoroughbred Horsemen's Association president Chris Block suggested that the relocation of the Arlington Million and other races is another sign that the Arlington Park racetrack is closed for good, adding: "What I want to do now is take a horse down there and win the first Arlington Million at Churchill Downs." Because the Churchill Downs turf course is smaller than the one used at Arlington, the distance of the race was shortened from  miles to  miles.

In December 2022 an agreement was reached between Churchill Downs and the American Graded Stakes Committee to move the 2023 Arlington Million to Colonial Downs in Virginia. The move will allow the race to return to its original distance of  miles.

Several times throughout the race's history, it was nationally televised, usually through a simulcast aired on WGN-TV picked up by their superstation feed, NBCSN, and TVG throughout the years.

Records
Time record:

At  miles
 1:58.69 - Awad (1995)

Most wins:
 2 - John Henry (1981, 1984)

Longest odds:

 40.60 - Mill Native (1988)

Shortest odds:

 0.50 - Bricks and Mortar (2019)

Most wins by an owner:
 2 - Dotsam Stable (1981, 1984) 
 2 - Juddmonte Farms (2000, 2002)
 2 - Godolphin (2003, 2022)

Most wins by a jockey:
 2 - Laffit Pincay, Jr. (1982, 1991)
 2 - Cash Asmussen (1988, 1992)
 2 - José A. Santos (1990, 1993)
 2 - Gary Stevens (1990, 1997)
 2 - Jerry D. Bailey (2000, 2002)
 2 - Ramon A. Dominguez (2009, 2012)
 2 - Irad Ortiz Jr. (2018, 2019)

Most wins by a trainer:
 4 - Chad Brown (2013, 2017, 2018, 2019)

Largest Margin of Victory:
 Estrapade (1986), Five Lengths

Shortest Margin of Victory:

 Nose - John Henry (1981)

Winners of the Arlington Million

 In 2021, the Arlington Million was known as the Mister D. Stakes.* Storming Home finished first in 2003 but was demoted to fourth place following a Stewards' Inquiry.** Powerscourt finished first in 2004 but was demoted to fourth place following a Stewards' Inquiry.*** The Apache finished first in 2013 but was demoted to second place following a Stewards' Inquiry.

References

Notes
 In 2015, The Pizza Man became the lone horse bred in Illinois to win the Million.
 No races were held at Arlington International Racecourse in 1998 or 1999, as the Illinois horse racing authorities did not authorise dates for the track.
 Starting in 1991, timing was arranged to hundredths.
 In 2004, Pat Gibson won a million pounds on the UK version of Who Wants to be a Millionaire? by correctly answering the Million was not a Triple Crown race in the United States (which were the Kentucky Derby, the Preakness Stakes and the Belmont Stakes).
 Starting in 2007, the winner of this race will qualify for the Breeders Cup World Thoroughbred Championships in the Turf Division.

External links
 Ten Things you should know about the Arlington Million at Hello Race Fans!

Open middle distance horse races
Recurring sporting events established in 1981
Grade 1 turf stakes races in the United States
Breeders' Cup Challenge series
Arlington Park
Turf races in the United States
Horse races in Illinois
1981 establishments in Illinois
Churchill Downs
Churchill Downs horse races